Parunthu (English:Eagle) is a 2008 Malayalam film by M. Padmakumar starring Mammootty and Jayasurya. The screenplay written by T.A. Rasaq.

Plot 
 
Blade Purushottaman, nicknamed Parunthu Purushu for the way he preys on his targets, is a heartless financier. His rude and insulting ways of talking to people who owe him money have hurt many people. 
Vinayan a young youth joins Parunthu Purushu to fight against Kallayi Azeez, who is Purushu's rival from childhood for his family needs.

Once Parunthu spoils the betrothal ceremony of Rakhi, the daughter of a Gujarati businessman Hemanth Bhai, who owes Parunthu a large sum. After the death of Hemanth Bhai, Rakhi takes money from Azeez. But for Azeez it was a trap and he wants more than money in return.

Later, Azeez sends a gunda to attack Purushu and brings him close to death. He is saved by Rekha and Vinayan. This changes Purushu and he decides to be a good man from then. The rest of the movie is about whether the people can accept him in his new character.

Cast 

 Mammootty as Parunthu Purushothaman
 Jayasurya as Vinayan
 Cochin Haneefa as Kunjachan
 Suraj Venjaramoodu as Mahendran
 Jayan Cherthala as Kallayi Azeez
 Jagathy Sreekumar as Hemanth Bhai
Saiju Kurup as Vineeth
 Lakshmi Rai as Rakhi
 Poornitha as Bhuvana
 Devan as Mahesh, Vineeth's brother
 Manka Mahesh as Vineeth's mother
 K. P. A. C. Lalitha as Narayaniamma
 Sabitha Anand as Kumariyamma, Purushu's Mother
 Augustine as Kumaran	 
 Mamukkoya as Kunjikka
 Jayakrishnan as CI Soman
 Balachandran Chullikkadu as Abraham
 Abu Salim as Prabhakaran
 Sreelatha Namboothiri as Seetha's Grand mother 
 Anil Murali as Sanjay, Seetha's husband
 Saju Kodiyan as Panicker
 Ambika Mohan as Vinayan's mother

Songs

The film score was composed by Ouseppachan while the songs were by Alex Paul with lyrics penned by Kanesh Punoor, Anil Panachooran and Sharath Vayalar.

References

External links 
 
 
 http://www.nowrunning.com/movie/5443/malayalam/parunthu/index.htm

2008 films
2000s Malayalam-language films
Films shot in Kozhikode
Films directed by M. Padmakumar
Films scored by Alex Paul